Chili or chilli may refer to:

Food
 Chili pepper, the spicy fruit of plants in the genus Capsicum; sometimes spelled "chilli" in the UK and "chile" in the southwestern US
 Chili powder, the dried, pulverized fruit of one or more varieties of chili pepper
 Chili con carne, often referred to simply as "chili", a stew with a chili sauce base
 Cincinnati chili, a meat sauce popular in Ohio and Northern Kentucky; different from Chili con carne
 Chili sauce

Places

China
 Zhili, formerly romanized as Chili, a former Chinese province

United States
 Chili, Indiana, an unincorporated town
 Chili, New Mexico, an unincorporated census-designated place
 Chili, New York, a suburb of Rochester
 Chili, Ohio, an unincorporated community
 Chili, Wisconsin, an unincorporated census-designated place
 Chili Gulch (also spelled Chile Gulch), a gulch in Calaveras County, California
 Chili Township, Hancock County, Illinois
 Chili, Illinois, an unincorporated community

People
 Dorothy Chili Bouchier (1909–1999), British actress
 Chen Chi-li (1943–2007), Taiwanese gangster
 Manuel Chili (1723-1796), Ecuadorian Baroque sculptor
 Pierfrancesco Chili (born 1964), Italian motorcycle racer
 Sue Chilly (also spelt Chilli; born 1954), co-founder of Black Women's Action in Australia in 1976
 Charles Chili Davis (born 1960), Jamaica-born American baseball player
 Claus Pilgaard (born 1965), Danish musician and entertainer also known as Chili Klaus
Rozonda Thomas (born 1971), American R&B singer-songwriter and actress whose stage name is "Chilli"

Fictional characters
 Chili (Pokémon), a character of the Pokémon universe
 Chili Palmer, a character in Get Shorty and Be Cool
 Chili Storm, a Marvel Comics character who appeared in Millie the Model stories and was spun off into her own title, Chili
 Chili, a tarantula in the 3D film It's Tough to Be a Bug!, based on the 1998 animated film A Bug's Life
 Chilli Heeler, Bluey's mother in Bluey (2018 TV series)

Other uses
 Chili Line, a former branch of the Denver and Rio Grande Western Railroad
 Chili Seminary, the original name of Roberts Wesleyan College, a Christian liberal arts college in Rochester, New York
 Chili's, a restaurant chain specializing in Tex-Mex food

See also

 Chile (disambiguation)
 Chilii (disambiguation)
 Chilly (disambiguation)
 
 

Lists of people by nickname